Devon Elizabeth Windsor (born March 7, 1994) is an American fashion model.

Early life and education
Devon Windsor was born and raised in St. Louis, Missouri. She is the daughter of Charles and Lisa Windsor, and has one sister, Alexandra. Windsor attended high school at Mary Institute and St. Louis Country Day School, where she played field hockey, lacrosse, tennis, and ran track. She competed at the 2012 Missouri State finals in the high jump event.

Career

2008–2013: Early work
Windsor was discovered when she was 14 years old by St. Louis fashion photographer Suzy Gorman. In 2008, Windsor signed with West Model & Talent Management. During high school, her first modeling jobs were for local St. Louis publications and fashion shows. In 2009, she joined a second agency, Vision Model Management, and worked in Los Angeles that summer. In 2010, Windsor signed with IMG Models in New York. After high school graduation in 2012, Windsor moved to Europe and worked with IMG Milan and IMG London. During this time, she worked with magazines, such as Gioia, Bullett, Punkt, and Creem.

2013–2015: Professional rise
In 2013, Windsor returned to New York City, where she walked her first fashion week for the Spring/Summer 2014 shows. A career changing moment for Windsor was walking for Prada in September 2013. During fittings, her hair was dyed platinum blonde. which became her signature look. Later that season, Models.com named Windsor as a "Top Newcomer" and included her on their 2013 "Hot List."

From 2013-2015, Windsor walked in 132 shows in New York, London, Paris, and Milan including Alexander McQueen, Celine, Chanel, Christian Dior SE, Emilio Pucci, Jean Paul Gaultier, Stella McCartney, Carolina Herrera, Fendi, Jason Wu, Max Mara, Michael Kors, Moschino, Salvatore Ferragamo, Tom Ford, Versace, Armani, Oscar de la Renta, Topshop, and Balmain.

During this time, Windsor appeared in editorials for Vogue Germany, Vogue Japan, Vogue Russia, Vogue Brazil, Vogue Thailand, Vogue Mexico, Vogue Turkey, Vogue Spain, CR Fashion Book, Harper’s Bazaar, Harper’s Bazaar Germany, Interview Germany, Numéro, Numero Tokyo, 10 Magazine, V, and Elle Brazil.

She shot her first Vogue cover for Vogue Turkey in 2014, and was also featured on the cover of Vogue Thailand, Elle Brazil, 10 Magazine, Oyster, and Wonderland.

Windsor was featured in advertisements and campaigns for Max Mara Studio, Jean Paul Gaultier, Love Moschino, Pink, Sephora, Michael Kors Fragrance, Nordstrom, Forever 21, and Nexxus.

In November 2013, she made her first appearance in the Victoria's Secret Fashion Show. In December 2014, Windsor made her second appearance in the Victoria’s Secret Fashion Show in London where she earned her first pair of wings.  In November 2015, she walked the show for a third year.

2016–2017
In 2016, Windsor made her Television debut on MasterChef Celebrity Showdown hosted by Gordon Ramsay. She faced-off with fellow model, Gigi Hadid. The two friends competed against each other to raise money for their favorite charities.

From 2016-2017, Windsor appeared in editorials for Vogue Mexico, Vogue Taiwan, Elle U.K., Allure Russia, V Magazine, Harper’s Bazaar Kazakhstan, French Revue de Modes, and Narcisse.

Windsor was featured on covers for Allure Russia, Harper’s Bazaar Kazakhstan, Maxim, Singles Korea, and Narcisse. In addition to booking the cover, Windsor made Maxim’s “Hot 100 List” in both 2016 and 2017.

Windsor’s 2016-2017 advertising campaigns included Forever 21, The Frye Company, Amazon Fashion, and was the face of H&M, Express, Inc., and Balmain Hair multiple times.

During this time period she walked for a variety of designers including three Tommy Hilfiger shows, Etam Développement, Zimmermann, and opened for Cushnie et Ochs. In 2016 and 2017, Windsor continued to book consecutive shows for the Victoria’s Secret Fashion Show.

In October 2017, Windsor made her film debut with a small role opposite Vince Vaughn in Brawl in Cell Block 99, when she played the role of Jill.

2018–present
In January 2018, Windsor made an appearance on the Lifetime show “Making a Model with Yolanda Hadid.”

Windsor starred in her first television series, Model Squad which airs on E! Entertainment.

In 2018, Windsor was featured in campaigns for Aritzia, Lucky Brand Jeans, Moroccan Oil, Casadei, Juicy Couture Oui Fragrance, Bjorn Borg, Elisabetta Franchi, and Zadig et Voltaire.

Windsor was featured in editorials and covers for L'Officiel Argentina, L'Officiel St. Barth, Numéro Tokyo, Elle Bulgaria, and D'Scene and shot editorials for Elle Middle East, Elle Russia, L'Officiel Argentina, Numéro Tokyo, and Vanity Fair Italy.

Windsor is currently listed on the Models.com Money Girls List. She has been listed on this since 2016. She was also listed on the Maxim "Hot 100 List" for the 3rd year in a row.

In summer 2019, Windsor launched her namesake swimwear line, Devon Windsor.

Windsor's campaign and advertising work in 2019 included jobs for Vince Camuto, Ramy Brook, Bloomingdale's, Bulliony, Matalan, Peter Hahn, and Bal Harbour Shops.

In 2019, Windsor was featured on the cover and in editorials for Elle Mexico, Ocean Drive Magazine, and Bal Harbour Magazine, and was in editorials for Numero Russia and Vogue Taiwan Beauty.

Personal life
Windsor has been known for her interest in food and cooking. She regularly shares her tips for fitness, beauty routines and recipes via interviews, social media, and her vlog on YouTube.

Windsor announced her engagement to businessman Jonathan Barbara, on June 24, 2018, and was married on November 16, 2019, on the island of Saint Barts.

On March 12, 2021, Windsor and Barbara announced they are expecting their first child, a girl. On September 8, 2021, she gave birth to their first child, Enzo Elodie Barbara. 

On November 21, 2022, she announced in her instagram account that is expecting to their second child.

Filmography

Film

Television

See also
Natasha Oakley, Instagram swimwear model

References

External links

 
 
 

1994 births
Female models from Missouri
People from St. Louis
Living people
American female models
Next Management models
21st-century American women
Prada exclusive models